Hypolycaena naara is a butterfly in the family Lycaenidae. It is found in Cameroon, Gabon, the Republic of the Congo, Angola and the Democratic Republic of the Congo (Kisangani).

References

External links

Die Gross-Schmetterlinge der Erde 13: Die Afrikanischen Tagfalter. Plate XIII 67 a

Butterflies described in 1873
Hypolycaenini
Butterflies of Africa
Taxa named by William Chapman Hewitson